Mohamed Hedi El Amri (born in Kalâa Seghira, January 1 1906 – 30 July 1978) was a Tunisian historian and writer.

Biography
After graduating from the University of Ez-Zitouna at age 20, he started teaching in an Islamic school in Tunis. In 1928 he was designated as the headmaster of an Islamic school in Monastir where he was to spend about 20 years of his life.

He contributed to the Tunisian and Egyptian press with many publications dealing with diverse subjects including politics, culture, religion and sociology. From the time of Tunisian independence he frequently participated  in national radio shows intended to elevate the public's awareness and comprehension of national issues.

Works
 The History of the Maghreb Throughout Seven Centuries
 Independence Day Memories
 Tunisia Throughout the Centuries.

1906 births
1978 deaths
20th-century Tunisian historians
University of Ez-Zitouna alumni